Swimming was contested at the 2019 Summer Universiade from 4 to 10 July 2019 at the Scandone Swimming Pool in Naples.

Medal summary

Medal table

Men's events

 Swimmers who participated in the heats only and received medals.

Women's events

 Swimmers who participated in the heats only and received medals.

References

External links
2019 Summer Universiade – Swimming
Results book (Archived version)

 
Universiade
2019 Summer Universiade events
Swimming at the Summer Universiade
2019 Summer Universiade